Thecla ziha, the white-spotted hairstreak, is a small butterfly found in India that belongs to the lycaenids or blues family.

Range
The butterfly occurs in India and Pakistan.

Status
In 1932, William Harry Evans described the species as rare.

See also
Lycaenidae
List of butterflies of India (Lycaenidae)

Cited references

References
 
 
 
 
 

Thecla (butterfly)
Butterflies of Asia
Butterflies described in 1865
Taxa named by William Chapman Hewitson